Lawson Duncan (born October 26, 1964) is a retired American tennis player. The right-hander reached his highest Association of Tennis Professionals singles ranking on May 20, 1985, when he became world No. 47. His best performance in a grand slam tennis tournament was the 1989 French Open, where he reached the fourth round.

A pioneer of the heavy topspin game, he was an All-America at Clemson University his freshman year before turning pro.  He plays in exhibition matches against longtime friend and former pro Tim Wilkison during special banquets in the Asheville area.  

Duncan graduated from Asheville High School in 1983.

Grand Prix / ATP career finals

Singles: 6 (0–6)

External links
 
 

1964 births
Living people
American male tennis players
Clemson Tigers men's tennis players
Sportspeople from Asheville, North Carolina
Tennis people from North Carolina